The 1992 Tasmanian state election was held on 1 February 1992.

Retiring Members

Liberal
 Neil Robson MHA (Bass)

House of Assembly
Sitting members are shown in bold text. Tickets that elected at least one MHA are highlighted in the relevant colour. Successful candidates are indicated by an asterisk (*).

Bass
Seven seats were up for election. The Labor Party was defending three seats. The Liberal Party was defending three seats. The Tasmanian Greens were defending one seat.

Braddon
Seven seats were up for election. The Labor Party was defending two seats. The Liberal Party was defending four seats. The Tasmanian Greens were defending one seat.

Denison
Seven seats were up for election. The Labor Party was defending three seats. The Liberal Party was defending three seats. The Tasmanian Greens were defending one seat.

Franklin
Seven seats were up for election. The Labor Party was defending three seats. The Liberal Party was defending three seats. The Tasmanian Greens were defending one seat.

Lyons
Seven seats were up for election. The Labor Party was defending two seats. The Liberal Party was defending four seats. The Tasmanian Greens were defending one seat.

See also
 Members of the Tasmanian House of Assembly, 1989–1992
 Members of the Tasmanian House of Assembly, 1992–1996

References
Tasmanian Parliamentary Library

Candidates for Tasmanian state elections